The Priesthill Group is a geologic group in Scotland. It preserves fossils dating back to the Silurian period.

See also

 List of fossiliferous stratigraphic units in Scotland

References
 

Geological groups of the United Kingdom
Geologic formations of Scotland
Silurian System of Europe
Silurian Scotland